The 2018 Macau Masters was a non-ranking team and six-red snooker variant invitational event that took place on 24 and 25 October 2018. The event's team event was made up of two teams of four, competing in six games, with Team B defeating Team A with a score of 5–1. The event's six red singles knockout tournament was won by Barry Hawkins.

Prize Fund
The event had a total prize fund of $100,000 awarded as follows:

Team event 
Winner: $50,000
Runner-up $30,000

Six-red event
Winner: $20,000

Tournament teams
The event was made up of two teams of four, with players playing in six "best of 5" frames matches. Frames 1, 3 and 5 were doubles matches, whereas frames 2 and 4 were alternate singles.

Results

Team event 
The team event saw both teams field teams of two for individual team matches. Each player could only play with a partner for one match during the event.

 Team result
 Team A 1:5 Team B

Six-red event
To finish the event, the 6 Reds Leapfrog Challenge took place. All 8-players played in a "killer" style match, with players required to win their match to continue on a winner stays on basis. The players were drawn based on world rankings. All matches were first to one frame of 6-red snooker, with the final being a best of 5 frame 6-red match.

References

Macau Masters
Macau Masters
Six-red snooker competitions
Snooker non-ranking competitions
International sports competitions hosted by Macau
October 2018 sports events in China